This is a list of notable people affiliated with the University of Illinois Urbana-Champaign, a public research university in Illinois.

Notable alumni
Not all listed alumni graduated from the university, and are so noted if the information is known.

Nobel Prize winners

 Edward Doisy, B.S. 1914, M.S. 1916 – Physiology or Medicine, 1943
 Vincent Du Vigneaud, B.S. 1923, M.S. 1924 – Chemistry, 1955; also served as faculty member
 Robert W. Holley, B.A. 1942 – Physiology or Medicine, 1968
 Jack Kilby, B.S. 1947 – Physics, 2000; inventor of the integrated circuit
 Edwin G. Krebs, B.A. 1940 – Physiology or Medicine, 1992
 Polykarp Kusch, M.S. 1933, Ph.D. 1936 – Physics, 1955
 John Schrieffer, M.S. 1954, Ph.D. 1957 – Physics, 1972; also served as faculty member
 Phillip Sharp, Ph.D. 1969 – Chemistry, 1993
 Wendell Stanley, M.S. 1927, PhD. 1929 – Chemistry 1946
 Rosalyn Yalow, M.S. 1942, Ph.D. 1945 – Physiology or Medicine, 1977

Pulitzer Prize winners
 Leonora LaPeter Anton, B.S. 1986 – Investigative Journalism, 2016
 Barry Bearak, M.S. 1974 – International Reporting, 2002
 Michael Colgrass, B.A. 1956 – Music, 1978
 George Crumb, M.A. 1952 – Music, 1968
 David Herbert Donald, M.A. 1942, Ph.D. 1946 – Biography, 1961 and 1988
 Roger Ebert, B.S. 1964 – Criticism, 1975
 Roy J. Harris, B.A. 1925 – Public Service, 1950
 Beth Henley, Drama, 1981
 Hugh F. Hough, B.S. 1951 – Local General or Spot News Reporting, 1974
 Paul Ingrassia, B.S. 1972 – Beat Reporting, 1993
 Allan Nevins, B.A. 1912, M.A. 1913 – Biography, 1933 and 1937
 Richard Powers, B.A. 1978, M.A. 1980 – Fiction, 2019
 James Reston, B.S. 1932 – National Reporting, 1945 and 1957
 Robert Lewis Taylor, B.A. 1933 – Fiction, 1959
 Carl Van Doren, B.A. 1907 – Biography, 1939
 Mark Van Doren, B.A. 1914 – Poetry, 1940

Academia

Notable professors and scholars
 Warren Ambrose, B.S. 1935, M.S. 1936, Ph.D. 1939 – Mathematics, Professor Emeritus of Mathematics at MIT; he is often considered one of the fathers of modern geometry.
 Icek Ajzen, M.A. 1967, Ph.D. 1969. – Social Psychology, Professor Emeritus at University of Massachusetts Amherst; Considered the most influential social psychologist. Known by his work on the theory of planned behavior. By 2021 has over 350,000 citations (google scholar). 
 Steven Bachrach, B.S., Ph.D. (University of California, Berkeley) – Dean of Science at Monmouth University, previously the Dr D. R. Semmes Distinguished Professor of Chemistry at Trinity University in San Antonio, Texas
 George C. Baldwin, Ph.D. 1943 – theoretical and experimental physicist and Professor of Nuclear Engineering, at General Electric Company, Rensselaer Polytechnic Institute, and Los Alamos National Laboratory
 Nancy Baym, M.A. 1988, Ph.D. 1994 – Professor of Communication Studies at the University of Kansas
 Arnold O. Beckman, B.S. 1922, M.S. 1923 – former Professor of Chemistry at Caltech
 Colin J. Bennett, Ph.D. 1986 – Professor of Political Science at the University of Victoria
 Saint Elmo Brady, Ph.D. 1916 – notable HBCU educator, first African American to obtain a Ph.D. degree in chemistry in the United States
 Roger Crossgrove, M.F.A. 1951 – Professor of Art Emeritus at the University of Connecticut
 Paul S. Dunkin, M.A. 1931, B.S. 1935, Ph.D. 1937 – Professor Emeritus of Library Services at Rutgers University
 Abdul Haque Faridi, Bangladeshi academic
 Gerald R. Ferris, Ph.D. – Francis Eppes Professor of Management and professor of psychology at Florida State University
 Jessica Greenberg – assistant professor of Anthropology and Russian, East European, and Eurasian Studies
 Allan Hay, Ph.D. 1955 – Tomlinson Emeritus Professor of Chemistry at McGill University
 Nick Holonyak, Jr., B.S. 1950, M.S. 1951, Ph.D. 1954 – 
 John Bardeen Endowed Chair Emeritus in Electrical and Computer Engineering and Physics at UIUC, member of National Academy of Engineering in Electronics, Communication & Information Systems Engineering and Materials Engineering for contributions to development of semiconductor controlled rectifiers, light emitting diodes, and diode laser, two time Nobel Prize Winner in Physics for work on the transistor and then for the BCS Theory of Superconductivity
 John Honnold, William A. Schnader Professor of Commercial Law at University of Pennsylvania Law School
 A.C. Littleton, B.S. 1912, M.S. 1918, Ph.D. 1931 – Professor and accounting historian University of Illinois, editor-in-chief The Accounting Review, Accounting Hall of Fame inductee
 Douglas A. Melton, B.S. – biologist, Xander University Professor at Harvard University
 Jennifer Mercieca, Ph.D.— American rhetorical scholar and Professor at Texas A&M University, author of Demagogue for President: The Rhetorical Genius of Donald Trump
 Michael Moore – professor of theoretical physics at the University of Manchester
 James Purdy, scholar of digital rhetoric
 Nora C. Quebral, Ph.D. – proponent of the development communication discipline; Professor Emeritus of development communication at University of the Philippines Los Baños
 Mark Reckase, University Distinguished Professor Emeritus of Michigan State University
 Maurice H. Rees, Medical educator and Dean of University of Colorado School of Medicine from 1925 to 1945
 Bernard Rosenthal, Ph.D. 1968 – Professor Emeritus of English at Binghamton University.
 Roy Vernon Scott, M.A. 1953, Ph.D. 1957 – Professor Emeritus of History at Mississippi State University
 Guy Standing, M.A. 1972 – Professor of Development Studies at the School of Oriental and African Studies (SOAS), University of London
 Gilbert Y. Steiner, Ph.D. 1950 – fourth president of the Brookings Institution
 Dewey Stuit, American educational psychologist; dean of the College of Arts at the University of Iowa from 1948 to 1977
 Clyde Summers, B.S. 1939, J.D. 1942, labor lawyer and law professor at the Yale Law School and University of Pennsylvania Law School, subject of In re Summers
 Maurice Cole Tanquary, A.B. 1907, M.A. 1908, Ph.D. 1912 – Professor of Entomology at several universities and member of the Crocker Land Expedition
 James Thomson, B.S. 1981 – Professor of Microbiology, University of Wisconsin – Madison
 Janis Driver Treworgy, M.A. 1983, Ph.D. 1985 – American academic and sedimentary geologist
 Clark R. Landis, B.A. 1980 – American academic and professor of Chemistry at University of Wisconsin–Madison

College presidents and vice-presidents
 Dr. Benjamin Allen – President, University of Northern Iowa
 John L. Anderson, M.S., Ph.D. – eighth president, Illinois Institute of Technology; former Provost, Case Western Reserve University
 Robert M. Berdahl, M.A. – President of American Association of Universities, former Chancellor of UC Berkeley, former President of University of Texas at Austin
 Warren E. Bow, M.A. – President of Wayne State University
 Alvin Bowman, Ph.D. – President, Illinois State University
 Tom Buchanan, Ph.D. – twenty-third president, University of Wyoming
 David L. Chicoine, Ph.D. – President, South Dakota State University
* Coching Chu, B.S. 1913 – sixteenth president, Zhejiang University (National Chekiang University period); former vice president, Chinese Academy of Sciences
 Ralph J. Cicerone, M.S. 1967, Ph.D. 1970 – President, National Academy of Sciences, former Chancellor of UC Irvine
 Lewis Collens, B.S., M.A. – seventh president, Illinois Institute of Technology
 John E. Cribbet, J.D. – legal scholar, Dean of the University of Illinois College of Law, and Chancellor of the University of Illinois
 Lois B. DeFleur, Ph.D. – President, Binghamton University, former Provost of University of Missouri
 W. Kent Fuchs, M.S. 1982, Ph.D. 1985 – twelfth president, University of Florida
 Philip Handler, Ph.D. 1939 – President, National Academy of Sciences
 Tori Haring-Smith, Ph.D. – President, Washington & Jefferson College
 Freeman A. Hrabowski III, M.A., Ph.D. – President, University of Maryland, Baltimore County
 Emil Q. Javier, B.S. 1964 – seventeenth president, University of the Philippines
 Alain E. Kaloyeros, Ph.D. 1987 – first president, State University of New York Polytechnic Institute
 Robert W. Kustra, Ph.D. – President, Boise State University
 Ray A. Laird, B.S. 1932 – President of Laredo Community College in Laredo, Texas, 1960 to 1974; born in Milford, Illinois, in 1907
 Judy Jolley Mohraz. Ph.D. 1974 – ninth president, Goucher College
 John Niland, Ph.D. 1970 – fourth president, University of New South Wales, Australia
 J. Wayne Reitz, M.S. 1935 – fifth president, University of Florida
 Steven B. Sample, B.S. 1962, M.S. 1963, Ph.D. 1965 – tenth president, University of Southern California
 David J. Schmidly, Ph.D., – twentieth president, University of New Mexico
 Michael Schwartz, B.S. 1958, M.A. 1959, Ph.D. 1962 – President Cleveland State University
 James J. Stukel, M.S. 1963, Ph.D. 1968 – fifteenth president, University of Illinois
 William D. Underwood, J.D. – eighteenth president, Mercer University
 Marvin Wachman, Ph.D. – President, Temple University, former President of Lincoln University
 Herman B Wells – President, Indiana University
 Chen Xujing – Vice President, Nankai University and Zhongsan University; President, Lingnan University and Jinan University

College provosts and vice provosts
 Joseph A. Alutto, M.A. – Provost, Ohio State University
 Richard C. Lee, Ph.D. – Vice Provost, University of Nevada, Las Vegas

Architecture
 Max Abramovitz, B.S. 1929 – architect on many campus and prominent international buildings including the United Nations Building,  Assembly Hall (since renamed to State Farm Center) and the Avery Fisher Hall at Lincoln Center in New York City
 Henry Bacon – architect of the Lincoln Memorial in Washington, D.C.
 Temple Hoyne Buell – architect for the first American central mall
 Jeanne Gang, B.S. 1986 – architect
 Walter Burley Griffin, B. Arch. 1899 – architect and designer of Canberra
 Ralph Johnson, B. Arch 1971 – principal architect of the Perkins+Will
 Ron Labinski - founder of HOK Sport
 David Miller, M. Arch 1972 – principal architect of the Miller/Hull partnership, FAIA
 César Pelli, M. Arch. 1954 – architect for the Petronas Twin Towers
 William Pereira, M. Arch. 1930 – notable mid-20th century American architect in Los Angeles, known for Transamerica Pyramid and Geisel Library
 Nathan Clifford Ricker, D. Arch. 1871 – first architect to receive a degree in architecture from an American institution
 Patricia Saldaña Natke, B. Arch. 1986 – architect
 William L. Steele – architect of the Prairie School during the early-twentieth century
 Ralph A. Vaughn (1907–2000) – academic, architect and film set designer; founded the Pi Psi chapter of Omega Psi Phi

Art
 Mark Staff Brandl, B.F.A. 1978 – artist, art historian and critic
 Christopher Brown, B.F.A. 1973 – painter, printmaker, and professor
 Annie Crawley – underwater photographer
 Greg Drasler, B.F.A. 1980; M.F.A. 1983 – artist and educator
 Leslie Erganian – artist and writer
 Hart D. Fisher, B.A. 1992 – comics book creator, comics publisher
 Tom Goldenberg, B.F.A. 1970 – artist and educator
 David Klamen, B.F.A. 1983 – artist and academic
 Chitra Ramanathan, B.F.A Painting, 1993, M.B.A 1997 - contemporary abstract painter and art educator
 Susan Rankaitis, B.F.A. 1971 – artist
 Angela M. Rivers, B.F.A. 1975 – Artist, Art Curator 
 Leo Segedin, B.F.A. 1948; M.F.A. 1950 – artist and educator
 Deb Sokolow, B.A. 1996 – artist
 Lorado Taft – sculptor, writer and educator
 Charles H. Traub, B.A. – photographer and educator
 Don Weeke, B.S. 1969 - fiber and gourd artist
 Vivian Zapata – Painter, Official artist of the 2005 Latin Grammys
 Barbara Zeigler – artist

Astronauts

 Scott Altman, B.S. 1981
 Lee J. Archambault, B.S. 1982, M.S. 1984
 Dale A. Gardner, B.S. 1970
 Michael S. Hopkins, B.S. 1992
 Steven R. Nagel, B.S. 1969
 Joseph R. Tanner, B.S. 1973

Business
 Irving Azoff, attended – CEO of Ticketmaster (2008-present); Executive Chairman Live Nation Entertainment
 Sunil Benimadhu, M.B.A 1992- chief executive officer of the Stock Exchange of Mauritius (2002–present)
 Jim Cantalupo, 1966 – chairman and chief executive officer of McDonald's (1991–2004)
 Stephen Carley, A.B. circa 1973 – chief executive officer of El Pollo Loco, former president and chief operating officer of Universal City Hollywood
 Jerry Colangelo, B.S. 1962 – president and chief executive officer of Phoenix Suns; managing general partner of Arizona Diamondbacks
 Jon Corzine, A.B. 1969 – chairman and chief executive officer of Goldman Sachs (1994–1999), cross listed in Politics section
 Bob Dudley, B.S. – managing director and chief executive officer-designate of BP
 Martin Eberhard, 1960 – co-founder and chief executive officer of Tesla Motors
 George T. Felbeck, B.S.M.E. 1919, M.S.M.E. 1921 – president of Union Carbide (1944–1962)
 George M.C. Fisher, 1962 – chief executive officer of Eastman Kodak (1993–2000)
 Ravin Gandhi – founder of GMM Nonstick Coatings
 John Georges, 1951 – chief executive officer of International Paper (1985–1996)
 Harry Gray, 1941 – chief executive officer of United Technologies (1974–1986)
 E.B. Harris, 1935 – president of the Chicago Mercantile Exchange
 Robert L. Johnson – founder of Black Entertainment Television; principal owner of the Charlotte Bobcats
 Pete Koomen, M.S. 2006 – co-founder of Optimizely
 Bruce Krasberg, 1930 – business executive and horticulturist
 Michael P. Krasny, B.S. 1975 – founder and chairman emeritus of CDW
 Arvind Krishna, M.S. 1987, Ph.D 1990 – Chief executive officer of IBM
 Stephen McLin, B.S. 1968 – former Bank of America executive
 Christopher Michel, B.A. 1990 – founder and chief executive officer of Military.com (1999–2007); founder and chief executive officer of Affinity Labs
 Steven L. Miller, B.S. 1967 – chief executive officer of Shell Oil (1999–2002)
 Tom Murphy, B.S. 1938 – chairman of General Motors
 Jim Oberweis – chairman of Oberweis Dairy
 Ron Popeil – attended (left after one year) – inventor of the infomercial
 C. W. Post – attended (left after two years) – breakfast cereal magnate
 Jasper Sanfilippo, Sr. – businessman and industrialist who led and substantially grew his family's nut business, John B. Sanfilippo & Son, Inc., into one of the largest in the world
 Abe Saperstein – creator of the Harlem Globetrotters
 Steve Sarowitz (born 1965/1966) – billionaire founder of Paylocity 
 Reshma Saujani – founder and CEO of Girls Who Code
 Therese Tucker – CEO and Founder of BlackLine
 Barbara Turf – CEO of Crate & Barrel (2008–2012)
 Jack Welch, M.S. 1959, Ph.D. 1961 – chief executive officer of General Electric (1981–2001)
 C. E. Woolman, 1912 – founder of Delta Air Lines
 Yi Gang, Ph.D. 1986 – director of State Administration of Foreign Exchange
 John D. Zeglis, B.S. 1969 – former president of AT&T; former chairman and chief executive officer of AT&T Wireless
 Marcin Kleczynski, B.S. 2012 – founder and CEO of Malwarebytes

Engineering and technology

 Shoaib Abbasi, B.S. 1980, M.S. 1980 – president and chief executive officer of Informatica
 Harlan Anderson, B.S., M.S. – computer pioneer and founder of Digital Equipment Corporation
 Marc Andreessen, B.S. 1993 – co-creator of Mosaic, co-founder of Netscape, currently co-founder of venture-capital firm Andreessen Horowitz
 Bruce Artwick, M.S. 1976 – creator of Microsoft Flight Simulator
 William F. Baker, M.S. 1980 – best known for being the structural engineer of Burj Khalifa, the world's tallest man-made structure
 Ken Batcher, Ph.D. 1969 – ACM/IEEE Eckert-Mauchly Award winner for work on parallel computers
 Arnold O. Beckman, B.S. 1922, M.S. 1923 – inventor of the pH meter, founder of Beckman Instruments; major donor to the university which included a gift to found the Beckman Institute; namesake of the Beckman Quadrangle
 Eric Bina, B.S. 1986, M.S. 1988 –- co-creator of the Mosaic and among the first employees of Netscape
 Donald Bitzer, B.S. 1955, M.S. 1956, Ph.D. 1960–2003 Emmy Award in Technical Achievement for the invention of the plasma display
 Ed Boon, B.S. 1986 – creator of the Mortal Kombat video game series
 Paul Bragiel, B.S. 1999 – co-founder Meetro & Bragiel Brothers, Colombian National Team cross-country skier
 Keith Brendley, B.S., 1980—leading authority on active protection systems and president of Artis, a research and development company
 Mike Byster, 1981 – mental calculator, mathematician
 Steve Chen – co-founder of YouTube
 Yixin Chen - professor of Computer Science and Engineering at Washington University in St. Louis.
 Ven Te Chow, Ph.D. – professor of hydrology
 John Cioffi, B.S. 1978 – father of DSL (broadband internet connection), Marconi Prize winner, founder of Amati Communications (sold to Texas Instruments), IEEE Fellow
 Jason David Danielson, B.S. – comedian in Japan
 Alan M. Davis, M.S. 1973, Ph.D. 1975 – IEEE Fellow for contributions to software engineering, author, entrepreneur
 Lemuel Davis, M.S. – software engineer in the field of computer animation; winner of a 1992 Academy of Motion Picture Arts and Sciences Scientific and Engineering Award
 James DeLaurier, B.S. – designed the first microwave-powered aircraft, the first engine-powered ornithopter, and the first human-carrying ornithopter
 Daniel W. Dobberpuhl, B.S. 1967 – creator of Alpha and StrongARM microprocessors at DEC
 Steve Dorner, B.S. 1983 – creator of Eudora
 Russell Dupuis, B.S. 1970, M.S. 1971, Ph.D. 1972 – professor at the Georgia Institute of Technology; co-recipient of the 2002 National Medal of Technology; awarded the 2007 IEEE Edison Medal; pioneer in metalorganic chemical vapor deposition and the commercialization of LEDs
 Brendan Eich, M.S. 1986 – creator of JavaScript; chief technology officer of Mozilla Corporation
 Larry Ellison, attended (left after sophomore year) – founder of Oracle Corporation
 Michael Hart, B.A. 1973 – founder of Project Gutenberg
 Tomlinson Holman, B.S. 1968 – creator of THX, professor at the USC School of Cinematic Arts
 John C. Houbolt, B.S. 1940, M.S. 1942 – retired NASA engineer who successfully promoted lunar orbit rendezvous for Apollo Space Program
 Jawed Karim, B.S. 2004 – co-founder of YouTube
 Fazlur Khan, Ph.D. 1955 – designer and builder of the Sears Tower, the tallest building in the world when it was built in 1973
 Shahid Khan, B.S. 1971 – owner of Flex-N-Gate Corp.; owner of Jacksonville Jaguars
 Ed Krol – author of Whole Internet User's Guide and Catalog
 Chris Lattner – author of LLVM and related projects, such as the compiler Clang and the programming language Swift.  At the start of 2017 he started working at Tesla Motors as vice president of Autopilot Software.
 Max Levchin, B.S. 1997 – co-founder of PayPal
 Jenny Levine, M.L.I.S. 1992 – evangelist for library technology and American Library Association Internet strategist
 Russel Simmons – co-founder and chief technical officer of Yelp!
 Bob Miner, B.A. (mathematics) 1963 – co-founder of Oracle Corporation
 Ray Ozzie, B.S. 1979 – creator of Lotus Notes cofounder of Lotus, co-president of Microsoft
 Anna Patterson, Ph.D 1988 – Vice President of Engineering, Artificial Intelligence at Google and co-founder of Cuil
 Emily S. Patterson, M.S., 1996, Ph.D, 1999 - Professor at Ohio State University College of Medicine
 Cecil Peabody – writer, graduate of MIT (1877) and professor at MIT
 Jerry Sanders, B.S. 1958 – co-founder and former chief executive officer of Advanced Micro Devices
 Peter Shirley, Ph.D. 1991 – Distinguished Scientist at NVIDIA recognized for contributions to real time ray tracing
 Thomas Siebel, B.A. 1975, M.B.A. 1983, M.S. 1985 – founder of Siebel Systems
 H. Gene Slottow, Ph.D. 1964 – 2003 Emmy Award in Technical Achievement for the invention of the plasma display
 Nadine Barrie Smith, B.S. 1985, M.S. 1989, Ph.D. 1996 – biomedical researcher in therapeutic ultrasound
 Jeremy Stoppelman – co-founder and chief executive officer of Yelp!
 Bill Stumpf – designer of the Aeron and Ergon ergonomic chairs
 Parisa Tabriz – head of security at Google Chrome
 Mark Tebbe – B.S. 1983 – co-founder of Lante Corporation and Answers.com
 Craig Vetter – BFA Industrial Design c. 1966 – founder of Vetter Fairing Company and Motorcycle Hall of Fame inductee
 Kevin Warwick – Senior Beckman Fellow, 2004 – cyborg scientist, University of Reading

Journalism and non-fiction broadcasting
 Jabari Asim, scholar-in-residence 2008–2010 – former editor-in-chief of The Crisis, The Washington Post Book World deputy editor, columnist; author
 Dan Balz, B.A. 1968, M.A. 1972 – Washington Post national political reporter and editor; author
 Claudia Cassidy, 1921 – Chicago Tribune music and drama critic
 John Chancellor – political analyst and newscaster for NBC Nightly News
 Roger Ebert, B.S. 1964 – film critic
 Sean Evans – host of YouTube series Hot Ones
 Bill Geist, 1968 – CBS News correspondent
 Robert Goralski, 1949 – NBC News correspondent
 Bob Grant – radio talk show personality
 Steven Hager – editor of High Times and founder of the Cannabis Cup
 Herb Keinon – columnist and journalist for The Jerusalem Post
 Frederick C Klein, B.A. 1959 – sportswriter for The Wall Street Journal and author
 Will Leitch – writer and founding editor of Deadspin
 Jane Marie, B.A. 2002 – journalist and podcaster, former producer of This American Life and founder of Little Everywhere
 Carol Marin, A.B. 1970 – former news anchor; 60 Minutes correspondent; Illinois Journalist of the Year (1988)
 Tom Merritt, B.S. journalism – technology journalist and broadcaster on TWiT.tv
 Charles (Charlie) Meyerson, B.S., 1977; M.S., 1978, journalism — radio, newspaper and internet reporter
 Robert Novak, B.A. 1952 – political commentator and columnist
 Suze Orman, B.A. 1976 – financial adviser and author
 Ian Punnett – radio talk-show personality, and Saturday-night host of Coast to Coast AM
 B. Mitchel Reed, B.S., M.A. – radio personality in Los Angeles and New York City
 Taylor Rooks, B.S. broadcast journalism – Big Ten Network television personality and sideline reporter
 Dan Savage – advice columnist (Savage Love) and theater director
 Gene Shalit, 1949 – film critic
 Patricia Thompson, 1969 – film and television producer
 Terry Teachout, M.A. music—theater critic and writer
 Douglas Wilson – television personality and designer (Trading Spaces)
 Gregor Ziemer – author and journalist, provided expert testimony during the Nuremberg Trials

Literature
 Nelson Algren, B.S. 1931 – author of 1950 National Book Award-winning The Man With the Golden Arm
 William Attaway, B.A. 1935 – author of Blood on the Forge
 Ann Bannon, B.A. 1955 – pulp-fiction writer, author of The Beebo Brinker Chronicles
 Dee Brown, M.S. 1951 – author of Bury My Heart at Wounded Knee
 John F. Callahan, M.A., Ph.D. – literary executor for Ralph Ellison
 Iris Chang, B.A. 1989 – author of The Rape of Nanking
 Mary Tracy Earle (1864–1955), American author
 Dave Eggers, attended 1980s and 90s, B.S. 2002 – author of A Heartbreaking Work of Staggering Genius, What Is the What, and Zeitoun
 Stanley Elkin, B.A. 1952, Ph.D. 1961 – National Book Critics Circle Award winner for George Mills in 1982 and for Mrs. Ted Bliss in 1995
 Lee Falk, 1932 – creator of The Phantom and Mandrake the Magician
 Rolando Hinojosa, Ph.D. 1969 – author of Klail City Death Trip Series
 Irene Hunt, B.A. 1939 – Newbery Medal-winning author of Up a Road Slowly
 Richmond Lattimore, Ph.D. 1935 – poet; translator of the Iliad and the Odyssey
 William Keepers Maxwell, Jr., B.A. 1930 – novelist and fiction editor of The New Yorker (1936–1976)
 Tulika Mehrotra, B.A 2002 – Author of Delhi Stopover and Crashing B-Town. Writer for magazines such as Harper's Bazaar, Vogue, India Today and Men's Health
 Nnedi Okorafor, B.A. 1996 – author of Binti, Who Fears Death, and Akata Witch
 Porsha Olayiwola, B.A. 2010 – Afrofuturist writer and poet laureate of Boston
 Harry Mark Petrakis, attended – novelist
 Richard Powers, M.A. 1979 – novelist and writer
 Shel Silverstein, attended (expelled) – poet, singer-songwriter, musician, composer, cartoonist, screenwriter and author of children's books (Where the Sidewalk Ends)
 Anne Valente, M.S. 2007 – novelist, author of Our Hearts Will Burn Us Down and By Light We Knew Our Name
 Larry Woiwode, 1964 – poet and novelist

Media
 Robert "Buck" Brown – Playboy cartoonist, creator of the libidinous "Granny" character, whose drawings also regularly addressed racial equality issues
 Dianne Chandler – Playboy Playmate of the Month, 1966
 Brant Hansen – radio personality for Air 1 network
 Erika Harold – Miss America 2003
 Judith Ford (Judi Nash), B.S. — Miss America 1969
 Hugh Hefner, B.A. 1949 – founder of Playboy magazine
 Nicole Hollander, B.A. 1960 – syndicated cartoonist of Sylvia
 James Holzhauer, B.S. 2005 – Jeopardy record-breaker and professional gambler
 Ken Paulson, J.D. – editor-in-chief of USA Today (2004–2008)
 Henry Petroski, Ph.D. 1968 – civil engineer and writer
 Irna Phillips, 1923 – creator of the soap opera

Military
 Lew Allen, Jr., M.S. 1952, Ph.D. 1954 – Chief of Staff of the United States Air Force
 Kenneth D. Bailey 1935 – Medal of Honor recipient
 Casper H. Conrad Jr., B.S. 1922 – U.S. Army brigadier general
 Reginald C. Harmon, LLB 1927 – first United States Air Force Judge Advocate General
 Thomas R. Lamont, J.D. 1972 – United States Assistant Secretary of the Army (Manpower and Reserve Affairs)
 Jerald D. Slack – U.S. Air National Guard Major General, Adjutant General of Wisconsin
 Herbert Sobel – U.S. Army Lieutenant Colonel, commander of Easy Company, 506th Infantry Regiment during World War II, featured in Band of Brothers
 Eugene L. Tattini – U.S. Air Force Lieutenant General
 David M. Van Buren, B.S. 1971 – Assistant Secretary of the Air Force (Acquisition)

Music
 Anton Armstrong – choral director
 Jay Bennett – musician for band Wilco
 Charles L. Bestor – composer and music educator
 Marty Casey, B.A. – lead vocalist of the band Lovehammers
 Rene Clausen – composer, conductor
 Ron Dewar – jazz saxophonist
 Alexander Djordjevic – pianist
 Neal Doughty, attended late 1960s – keyboard player and founding member of REO Speedwagon
 Dan Fogelberg – singer-songwriter
 Nathan Gunn – baritone, opera singer
 John B. Haberlen – director of Georgia State University school of music
 Jerry Hadley – opera singer
 Chan Hing-yan – composer and music educator
 Kenneth Jennings – composer and music educator
 Craig Hella Johnson – choir conductor
 Curtis Jones – house music producer
 Mike Kinsella, 1999 – indie-rock musician; frontman of American Football
 Brian Krock - multi-instrumentalist, composer, arranger and bandleader of Big Heart Machine and liddle
 Jeffrey Kurtzman - musicologist and music editor
 Jim McNeely – jazz pianist, composer, and arranger
 Donald Nally – choral director
 Bob Nanna – indie-rock musician; founder of the bands Friction, Braid, Hey Mercedes, and The City on Film
 Psalm One – hip-hop artist
 John Pierce (born 1959), operatic tenor and academic voice teacher
 Mary McCarty Snow – composer
 Matt Wertz – singer-songwriter
 Carolyn Kuan – conductor, pianist, music director for Hartford Symphony Orchestra
 Brian Courtney Wilson – Grammy Nominated Gospel artist
 Noam Pikelny – Banjo player; recipient of Steve Martin Award for Excellence in Banjo and Bluegrass

Performing arts
 Ruth Attaway – Broadway and film actress (You Can't Take It With You, Raintree County, Porgy and Bess, and Being There)
 Barbara Bain, B.S. – winner of three consecutive Emmy Awards for the role of Cinnamon Carter in Mission: Impossible
 Betsy Brandt, B.F.A. 1996 – television actress (Marie Schrader in Breaking Bad)
 Timothy Carhart – film and television actor (Pink Cadillac, The Hunt for Red October)
 Terrence Connor Carson – singer and stage, voice, and television actor
 Arden Cho – actress
 Andrew Davis – film director (The Fugitive)
 Janice Ferri Esser, B.F.A. 1981, M.S. 1982 – Daytime Emmy-winning writer (The Young & the Restless)
 Dominic Fumusa, M.F.A. 1994 – actor (Nurse Jackie)
 Grant Gee – film director (Meeting People Is Easy)
 Nancy Lee Grahn, briefly attended – Daytime Emmy-winning actress
 Gene Hackman, attended – five-time Academy Award-nominated actor
 Jonathan Hammond – film director (We All Die Alone)
 Shanola Hampton – actor (Shameless)
 Arte Johnson, 1949 – Laugh-In television personality
 Margaret Judson – television actress (The Newsroom)
 Chris Landreth, B.S. 1984, M.S. 1986 – Academy Award-winning animator (Best Animated Short Film, 2004, '"Ryan")
 Ang Lee, B.F.A. 1980 – Academy Award-winning movie director (Best Director, 2005, Brokeback Mountain; 2012, Life of Pi)
 Ned Luke, 1979 – actor (Grand Theft Auto V)
 John Franklin, 1983– Isaac (Children of the Corn (1984 film))
 Mary Elizabeth Mastrantonio, 1980 – actress (Scarface, Robin Hood: Prince of Thieves, The Color of Money)
 John McNaughton – film and television director (Henry: Portrait of a Serial Killer, Wild Things)
 Ryan McPartlin – actor (Chuck)
 Donna Mills – film and television actress (Knots Landing)
 Ben Murphy – television actor (Alias Smith and Jones)
 Lucas Neff – actor (Raising Hope)
 Nick Offerman, 1993 – actor (Parks and Recreation)
 Jerry Orbach, B.A. – Broadway, film and television actor (Dirty Dancing, Detective Lennie Briscoe in Law & Order)
 Peter Palmer – actor and singer; played "Li'l Abner" on Broadway and film
 Larry Parks – Academy-Award-nominated actor; blacklisted in Hollywood after testifying before the House Un-American Activities Committee
 Andy Richter, briefly attended – actor and Conan O'Brien sidekick
 Alan Ruck – actor (Ferris Bueller's Day Off, Star Trek Generations, Spin City, Succession)
 Jonathan Sadowski – actor ($#*! My Dad Says)
 Allan Sherman – comedian (known for the Grammy Award-winning novelty song "Hello Muddah, Hello Faddah"; television writer and producer (co-creator of I've Got a Secret)
 Sushanth, B.E. – Telugu actor
 Lynne Thigpen, B.A. 1970–1997 Tony Award-winning actress (Where in the World Is Carmen Sandiego?)
 Prashanth Venkataramanujam, B.S. 2009 – Television comedy writer and producer
 Grant Williams – film actor (The Incredible Shrinking Man) and operatic tenor
 Roger Young, M.S. – Emmy Award-winning TV and movie director

Politics and Government

U.S. Senate
 Carol Moseley Braun – first African-American female United States Senator (Illinois, 1993–1999); U.S. Ambassador to New Zealand and Samoa (1999–2001)
 Prentiss M. Brown – United States Senator from Michigan (1936–1943); U.S. Representative from Michigan (1933–1936)
 Jon Corzine, A.B. 1969 – Governor of New Jersey (2006–2010) and U.S. Senator from New Jersey (2001–2006), cross listed in Business section
 Alan J. Dixon, B.S. – United States Senator from Illinois (1981–1993); 34th Illinois Secretary of State
 John Porter East, Law, 1959 – United States Senator from North Carolina (1981–1986)
 Kelly Loeffler, B.S. 1992 – United States Senator from Georgia (2020–2021)

U.S. House of Representatives
 John Anderson – U.S. Representative from Illinois (1961–1981); 1980 presidential candidate
 Willis J. Bailey, 1879 – United States Representative and the 16th Governor of Kansas
 Terry L. Bruce – U.S. Representative from Illinois's 19th congressional district (1985–1993). He earned his B.A. in 1966 and his J.D. in 1969.
 Larry Bucshon — U.S. Representative from Indiana (since 2011)
 Nikki Budzinski — U.S. Representative from Illinois (Since 2023)
 Edwin V. Champion – U.S. Representative from Illinois (1937–1939)
 William J. Graham, B.L. 1893 – U.S. Representative from Illinois (1917–1924)
 George Evan Howell, B.S. 1927, LL.B. 1930 – U.S. Representative from Illinois (1941–1947)
 Jesse Jackson, Jr., J.D. 1993 – U.S. Representative from Illinois (1995–2012)
 Tim Johnson, B.A. 1969, J.D. 1972 – U.S. Representative from Illinois (2001–2013)
 Lynn Morley Martin, B.A. 1960 – U.S. Representative from Illinois (1981–1991) and Secretary of Labor in the cabinet of George H. W. Bush (1991–1993)
 Peter Roskam, B.A. 1983 – U.S. Representative from Illinois (since 2007), House Republican Chief Deputy Whip (2011–2014)
 Kurt Schrader, B.S. 1975, D.V.M. 1977 – U.S. Representative from Oregon (since 2009)
 Jan Schakowsky, B.S. 1965 – U.S. Representative from Illinois (since 1999)
 Steve Schiff, B.A. 1968 – U.S. Representative from New Mexico (1989–1998)
 Harold H. Velde, J.D. 1937 – U.S. Representative from Illinois (1949–1957)
 Jerry Weller, B.S. 1979 – U.S. Representative from Illinois (1995–2009)

Executive Branch Officials

 Nancy Brinker, 1968 – founder of Susan G. Komen for the Cure; Chief of Protocol of the United States, United States Ambassador to Hungary (2001–2003)
 Mark Filip, B.A. 1988 – acting Attorney General of the United States (2009); Deputy Attorney General of the United States (2008–2009); Judge for the U.S. District Court for the Northern District of Illinois (2004–2008)
 William Marion Jardine – served as the United States Secretary of Agriculture and the U.S. Ambassador to Egypt
 Neel Kashkari, B.S. 1995, M.S. 1997 – Interim Assistant Secretary of the Treasury for Financial Stability in the United States Department of the Treasury
 Julius B. Richmond, B.S., M.S. 1939 – 12th United States Surgeon General and the United States Assistant Secretary for Health (1977–1981); vice admiral in the United States Public Health Service Commissioned Corps; first national director for Project Head Start
 Samuel K. Skinner, 1960 – Secretary of Transportation (1989–1991); White House Chief of Staff during the George H. W. Bush Administration (1992)
 Louis E. Sola, M.S. 1998 – Commissioner, Federal Maritime Commission.
 Phillips Talbot – United States diplomat, United States Ambassador to Greece (1965–1969)

Statewide Offices
 Russell Olson, attended – 39th Lieutenant Governor of Wisconsin (1979–1983)
 Ashton C. Shallenberger – 15th Governor of Nebraska
 Samuel H. Shapiro – 34th Governor of Illinois (1968); 38th Lieutenant Governor of Illinois (1961–1968)
 Juliana Stratton – 48th lieutenant governor of Illinois
 Frank White, 1880 – eighth Governor of North Dakota
 Leslie Munger – former Illinois Comptroller (2015–2017)

State Legislators
 Aaron Ortiz, B.A. 2013 – Illinois House of Representatives & Chicago 14th Ward Committeeman (since 2018) 
 David S. Olsen, B.S. 2011- Illinois House of Representatives (since 2016–2019)
 Kiah Morris, B.S. 2006- Vermont House of Representatives (since 2014)
 Tom Fink, J.D. 1952 – Speaker of the Alaska House of Representatives (1973), Mayor of Anchorage (1987–1994)
 Allen J. Flannigan – Wisconsin State Assemblyman (1957–1966)
 Jehan Gordon-Booth – Illinois House of Representatives (since 2009)
 Chuck Graham, B.S. 1987 – Missouri House of Representatives (1996–2002), Missouri State Senate 2004
 Robert W. Pritchard – Illinois House of Representatives (since 2003), former Chairman of the DeKalb County Board (1998–2003)
 Thomas P. Sinnett, 1909 – Illinois House of Representatives (1924–1940), Democratic Party Floor Leader (1932–1934)

Judiciary
 Wayne Andersen, J.D. 1970 – Judge of the United States District Court for the Northern District of Illinois
 Harold Baker, J.D. 1956 – Judge of the United States District Court for the Central District of Illinois
 Charles Guy Briggle, LL.B. 1904 – Judge of the United States District Court for the Southern District of Illinois
 Henry M. Britt, 1941 and 1947 (law) – Arkansas Republican pioneer and circuit judge in Hot Springs
 Colin S. Bruce, B.A. 1986, J.D. 1989 – Judge of the United States District Court for the Central District of Illinois
 Owen McIntosh Burns, B.A. 1916, LL.B. 1921 – Judge of the United States District Court for the Western District of Pennsylvania
 Thomas R. Chiola, J.D. 1977 – Judge of the Illinois Circuit Court of Cook County, first openly gay elected official in Illinois
 Brian Cogan, B.A. 1975 – Judge of the United States District Court for the Eastern District of New York
 Bernard Martin Decker, B.A. 1926 – Judge of the United States District Court for the Northern District of Illinois
 Arno H. Denecke, LL.B. 1939 – Chief Justice of the Oregon Supreme Court
 Richard Everett Dorr, B.S. 1965 – Judge of the United States District Court for the Western District of Missouri
 Thomas M. Durkin, B.S. 1975 – Judge of the United States District Court for the Northern District of Illinois
 Mark Filip, B.A. 1988 – Judge of the United States District Court for the Northern District of Illinois
 James L. Foreman, B.S. 1950, J.D. 1952 – Judge of the United States District Court for the Southern District of Illinois
 Rita B. Garman, B.S. 1965 – Justice of the Illinois Supreme Court (since 2001)
 John Phil Gilbert, B.S. 1971 – Judge of the United States District Court for the Southern District of Illinois
 William J. Graham, B.L. 1893 – Judge of the United States Court of Customs and Patent Appeals
 James F. Holderman, B.S. 1968, J.D. 1971 – Judge of the United States District Court for the Northern District of Illinois
 George Evan Howell, B.S. 1927, LL.B. 1930 – Judge of the United States Court of Claims
 William F. Jung, J.D. 1983 – Judge of the United States District Court for the Middle District of Florida
 Frederick J. Kapala, J.D. 1976 – Judge of the United States District Court for the Northern District of Illinois
 Lloyd A. Karmeier, B.A. 1962, J.D. 1964 – Justice of the Illinois Supreme Court (since 2004)
 Alfred Younges Kirkland Sr., B.A. 1941, J.D. 1943 – Judge of the United States District Court for the Northern District of Illinois
 Ray Klingbiel, LL.B. 1924 – Chief Justice of the Illinois Supreme Court
 Walter C. Lindley, LL.B. 1904, J.D. 1910 – Judge of the United States Court of Appeals for the Seventh Circuit
 J. Warren Madden, B.A. 1911 – Judge of the United States Court of Claims
 George M. Marovich, B.S. 1952, J.D. 1954 – Judge of the United States District Court for the Northern District of Illinois
 Prentice Marshall, B.S. 1949, J.D. 1951 – Judge of the United States District Court for the Northern District of Illinois
 William J. Martinez, B.A. 1977, B.S. 1977 – Judge of the United States District Court for the District of Colorado
 Frederick Olen Mercer, LL.B. 1924 – Judge of the United States District Court for the Southern District of Illinois
 Patricia Millett, B.A. 1985 – Judge of the United States Court of Appeals for the District of Columbia Circuit
 Ramon Ocasio III – 6th Judicial Subcircuit Judge, Cook County, Illinois (since 2006)
 George True Page – Judge of the United States Court of Appeals for the Seventh Circuit
 Casper Platt, B.A. 1914 – Judge of the United States District Court for the Eastern District of Illinois
 Philip Godfrey Reinhard, B.A. 1962, J.D. 1964 – Judge of the United States District Court for the Northern District of Illinois
 Scovel Richardson, B.A. 1934, M.A. 1936 – Judge of the United States Court of International Trade
 Nancy J. Rosenstengel, B.A. 1990 – Judge of the United States District Court for the Southern District of Illinois
 Stanley Julian Roszkowski, B.S. 1949, J.D. 1954 – Judge of the United States District Court for the Northern District of Illinois
 Howard C. Ryan – Chief Justice of the Illinois Supreme Court
 John Sanders, B.S. Political Science 1985 – Williamson County Judge
 Roy Solfisburg, J.D. 1940 – Chief Justice of the Illinois Supreme Court
 Robert C. Underwood, LL.B. 1939 – Justice of the Illinois Supreme Court (1962–1984)
 Fred Louis Wham, LL.B. 1909 – Judge of the United States District Court for the Eastern District of Illinois
 Harlington Wood Jr., B.A. 1942, J.D. 1948 – Judge of the United States Court of Appeals for the Seventh Circuit
 Staci Michelle Yandle, B.S. 1983 – Judge of the United States District Court for the Southern District of Illinois

Local Offices
 Michael Cabonargi, commissioner of the Cook County Board of Review
 Bob Fioretti, B.A. in Political Science 1975, Chicago alderman, 2007–2015
 M.J. Khan, Master's in Engineering – former member of the Houston City Council
 Dick Murphy, B.A. 1965 – Mayor of San Diego (2000–2005)
 Thomas D. Westfall (1927–2005) – former mayor of El Paso, Texas

Activists
 James Brady, 1962 – White House Press Secretary under Ronald Reagan, hand-gun-control advocate
 Dorothy Day, 1918 – founder of the Catholic Worker Movement
 Jesse Jackson – civil-rights leader; presidential candidate; founder of the Rainbow/PUSH Coalition
 Victor Kamber, B.S. 1965 – formed The Kamber Group, working for Democratic Party candidates and labor unions
 Vashti McCollum – political activist for the separation of religion and public education and the plaintiff of the McCollum case
 Carlos Montezuma (Wassaja), B.S. 1884 – Native American activist and a founding member of the Society of American Indians
 Atour Sargon, B.A. – Assyrian American activist, first ethnic Assyrian elected to the Lincolnwood board of trustees
 Albert Shanker – president of the United Federation of Teachers (1964–1984); president of the American Federation of Teachers (1974–1997)

International Figures
 Giorgi Kvirikashvili, M.S. 1998 – Prime Minister of Georgia
 Berhane Abrehe, M.S. 1972 – Third Minister of Finance of Eritrea
 Rafael Correa, Ph.D. 2001 — President and former Secretary (Minister) of Finances of Ecuador
 Cüneyd Düzyol, M.S. 1996 – Turkish Minister of Development
 Mustafa Khalil, M.S. 1948, Ph.D., 1951 – former Prime Minister of Egypt (1978–1980)
 Atef Ebeid, Ph.D. 1962 – former Prime Minister of Egypt (1999–2004)
 Annette Lu – former vice-president of Taiwan (2000–2008)
 Oran McPherson – former Speaker of the Legislative Assembly of Alberta; Minister of Public Works for the United Farmers of Alberta government
 Maxwell Mkwezalamba, Ph.D. 1995 – Commissioner for Economic Affairs for the African Union Commission (since 2004)
 Fidel V. Ramos, 1951 – former President of the Philippines (1992–1998)
 Kandeh Yumkella, Ph.D. 1991 – Director-General of the United Nations Industrial Development Organization
 Lin Chuan, Ph.D. – Current Premier of Taiwan and former Minister of Finance.
 Sri Mulyani Indrawati, M.Sc., Ph.D. – 26th Finance Minister of Indonesia (2016-now) & Managing Director of the World Bank Group (1 June 2010 – 27 July 2016)
 Bambang Brodjonegoro, Prof., S.E., M.U.P., Ph.D. – 13th Minister of National Development Planning of Indonesia (2016-now) & 29th Finance Minister of Indonesia (27 October 2014 – 27 July 2016)
 Rajai Muasher, M.Sc., Ph.D. – Jordan's Deputy Prime Minister and Minister of State for Prime Ministry Affairs
 Sixtus Lanner – Austrian member of Parliament

Other
 Jill Wine-Banks, B.S. – Watergate prosecutor; General Counsel of the Army (1977–1980); Executive Director of the American Bar Association

Science and mathematics
 MiMi Aung, BSEE 1988, MS 1990 – lead engineer on the Mars Helicopter Ingenuity
 Rudolf Bayer, Ph.D. 1966 – Mathematician and Computer Scientist known for b-tree and red–black tree
 Ahmet Nihat Berker, Ph.D. 1977 – condensed matter physicist; president of Sabancı University, Istanbul–Turkey
 David Blackwell, Ph.D. 1941 – mathematician; 2010 Rao–Blackwell theorem; first African American to be inducted into the National Academy of Sciences (1965); first black tenured faculty member at the University of California, Berkeley
 Murray S. Blum – entomologist, authority on chemical ecology and pheromones
 Harold E. Brooks, Ph.D. 1990 – atmospheric scientist; tornado climatology expert
 John Carbon, B.S. 1952 – biochemist; National Academy of Sciences member
 Stephen S. Chang, Ph.D. 1952 – food scientist; recipient, IFT Stephen S. Chang Award for Lipid or Flavor Science
 Alfred Y. Cho, B.S. 1960, M.S. 1961, Ph.D. 1968 – father of molecular beam epitaxy; received the National Medal of Science in 1993
 Karl Clark, Ph.D. – discovered the hot water oil separation process
 Cutler J. Cleveland, Ph.D. – editor-in-chief of the Encyclopedia of Energy and the Encyclopedia of Earth
 Ronald Cohn, B.S. 1965, M.S. 1967, Ph.D. 1971 – researcher and cameraman who helped document Koko, the mountain gorilla
 Ronald Fuchs,   M.S. 1955, PhD in 1957 – physicist
 Donald Geman, B.A. 1965 – applied mathematician, who discovered the Gibbs sampler method in computer vision, Random forests in machine learning, and the Top Scoring Pairs (TSP) classifier in bioinformatics; professor at Johns Hopkins University
 Josephine Burns Glasgow, A.B., 1909, Master's degree, Ph.D. in mathematics, 1913 – the second woman to receive a Ph.D. from Illinois University
 Gene H. Golub, B.S. 1953, M.A. 1954, Ph.D. 1959 – B. Bolzano Gold Medal for Merits in the Field of Mathematical
 T. R. Govindachari, Post-doc 1946–49, Natural product chemist, Shanti Swarup Bhatnagar laureate
 Temple Grandin, Ph.D. 1989 – animal scientist; bestselling author; consultant to the livestock industry in animal behavior; her biopic (about her life as a woman diagnosed with autism at age two) won five Emmy Awards in 2010
 Paul Halmos, B.S. 1935, Ph.D. 1938 – mathematician
 Richard Hamming, Ph.D. 1942 – mathematician; developed Hamming code and Hamming distance; winner of 1968 ACM Turing Award; namesake of the IEEE's Richard W. Hamming Medal
 Leslie M. Hicks, Ph.D. 2005- analytical chemist
 Donald G. Higman, Ph.D. 1952– mathematician, discovered the Higman–Sims group
 Deborah M. Hinton, M.S. 1976, Ph.D. 1980, microbiologist,  chief of the gene expression and regulation section in the laboratory of cell and molecular biology at the National Institute of Diabetes and Digestive and Kidney Diseases.
 Donald Johanson, B.S. 1966 – anthropologist, discoverer of oldest known hominid, "Lucy"
 W. Dudley Johnson, B.S. 1951 – cardiac surgeon known as the father of coronary artery bypass surgery
 David A. Johnston, B.S. 1971 – USGS volcanologist killed in the 1980 eruption of Mount St. Helens
 Charles David Keeling, B.S. 1948 – chemist, alerted the world about the possible connection between climate change and human activity
 Michael Lacey, Ph.D. 1987 – awarded the Salem Prize for solving conjectures about the Bilinear Hilbert Transform
 Richard Leibler, Ph.D. 1939 – mathematician and cryptanalyst; formulated the Kullback–Leibler divergence, a measure of similarity between probability distributions; directed the Princeton center of the Institute for Defense Analysis
 Sandra Leiblum, Ph.D. – sexologist
 Stephanie A. Majewski, B.S. 2002; Ph.D. Stanford University 2007 – physicist
 Eloisa Biasotto Mano (1924–2019), Brazilian chemist, professor
 Jeffrey S. Moore, Ph.D. 1989 – chemist
 Catherine J. Murphy, B.S. 1986 – chemist
 P. T. Narasimhan, Post-doc 1957–59 – theoretical chemist, Shanti Swarup Bhatnagar laureate
 Rahul Pandit, MS and PhD 1977–82 – condensed matter physicist, Shanti Swarup Bhatnagar laureate
 Francine Patterson, B.S. 1970 – researcher who taught a modified version of American Sign Language to a mountain gorilla named Koko
 Mary Lynn Reed, Ph.D. 1995 – Chief of Mathematics Research at the National Security Agency and president of the Crypto-Mathematics Institute
 Harold Reetz, Ph. D. crop physiology and ecology, agronomist and former President of the Foundation for Agronomic Research 
 Idun Reiten, Ph.D. 1971 – professor of mathematics; considered to be one of Norway's greatest living mathematicians
 John A. Rogers – physical chemist and a materials scientist
 Allan Sandage, B.S., 1948 – astronomer and cosmologist; winner of 1991 Crafoord Prize
 Pierre Sokolsky, Ph.D. 1973 – astrophysicist, Panofsky Prize Laureate, directed the HiRES Cosmic Ray Detector project and pioneer in ultra-high-energy cosmic ray physics
 Leia Stirling – American Association for the Advancement of Science Leshner Leadership Fellow and Massachusetts Institute of Technology Professor in Human–computer interaction
 Steven Takiff, Ph.D. 1970 – mathematician
 Charles W. Woodworth, B.S. 1885, M.S. 1886 – founder of the Division of Entomology, University of California, Berkeley; the PBESA gives the C. W. Woodworth Award
 Andrew Chi-Chih Yao, Ph.D. 1975 – computer scientist, winner of 2000 ACM Turing Award
 K. R. Sridhar, M.S. 1984, Ph.D. 1989 – Founder of Bloom Energy
 Alessandro Piccolo, chemist and agricultural scientist Humboldt Prize in Chemistry 1999
 D Sangeeta, Ph.D. 1990 – Materials Chemistry, awarded 26 patents related to jet engine technology and material science, author of "Handbook Of Inorganic Materials Chemistry" (1997), co-author "Inorganic Materials Chemistry Desk Reference" (2004), CEO & Founder Gotara

Sports

Administration
 Ron Guenther, B.S. 1967, M.S. 1968 – Illinois Fighting Illini Athletic Director (1992–2011)
 Tony Khan, B.S. 2007 – President of All Elite Wrestling, Senior Vice President of Football Administration and Technology of Jacksonville Jaguars, Vice Chairman and Director of Football Operations of Fulham F.C., son of Shahid Khan
 Chester Pittser, B.S. 1924 – Miami University football and basketball coach (1924–1931), Montclair State College football, basketball and baseball coach (1934–1943)
 Doug Mills – (1926–1930), Illinois Fighting Illini Athletic Director (1941–1966), Illinois Fighting Illini men's basketball Head Coach (1936–1947)
 Josh Whitman, B.S. 2001, J.D. 2008 – Illinois Fighting Illini Athletic Director (2016–present), former NFL player

Baseball

 Jason Anderson – Major League Baseball player
 Dick Barrett – former Major League Baseball player, member of Pacific Coast League Hall of Fame
 Fred Beebe – late Major League Baseball player
 Lou Boudreau – late Major League Baseball player; member of the Baseball Hall of Fame
 Mark Dalesandro – former Major League Baseball catcher and third baseman
 Hoot Evers – former Major League Baseball outfielder (two-time All-Star)
 Darrin Fletcher – former Major League Baseball catcher
 Moe Franklin – Major League Baseball player.
 Tom Haller – former Major League Baseball catcher
 Ken Holtzman – former Major League Baseball 2-time All-Star pitcher and Israel Baseball League manager
 Tanner Roark – Major League Baseball pitcher, Washington Nationals
 Marv Rotblatt – Major League Baseball pitcher, Chicago White Sox
 Scott Spiezio – has played for the St. Louis Cardinals, Oakland Athletics, Anaheim Angels, and Seattle Mariners
 Terry Wells – retired Major League Baseball pitcher

Basketball

 Nick Anderson – (1987–1989), played professionally for the NBA's Orlando Magic and Sacramento Kings
 James Augustine – basketball (2002–2006), played two seasons for the NBA's Orlando Magic, all-time leader in rebounds at Illinois
 Steve Bardo – former National Basketball Association player, current ESPN & Big Ten Network basketball analyst
 Kenny Battle – played in 4 NBA seasons for the Phoenix Suns, Denver Nuggets, Boston Celtics and Golden State Warriors
 Tal Brody – American-Israeli former Euroleague basketball player
 Dee Brown – former National Basketball Association player
 Chuck Carney – (1918–1921), First Big Ten athlete to be named a football and basketball All-American, Helms Foundation College Basketball Player of the Year (1922), twice named a Helms Foundation All-American for basketball (1920 & 1922)
 Jerry Colangelo – (1958–1962), Former owner of the NBA's Phoenix Suns, the WNBA's Phoenix Mercury, the CISL's Arizona Sandsharks, the Arena Football League's Arizona Rattlers and MLB's Arizona Diamondbacks
 Brian Cook – (1999–2003), Fifth all-time scorer for the Illini, played professionally in NBA
Ayo Dosunmu professional basketball player for the National Basketball Association's Chicago Bulls
 Nnanna Egwu – professional basketball player for the National Basketball League of Australia and New Zealand
 Kendall Gill – (1986–1990), 1990 consensus All-American and Big 10 Player of the Year, played professionally for 15 seasons in the NBA
 Lowell Hamilton – (1985–1989), played Professional Basketball in Greece.
 Derek Harper – (1980–1983), played professionally for 16 seasons in the NBA, ranked 11th all-time in steals and 17th in assists
 Luther Head – (2001–2005), guard for the Sacramento Kings
 Malcolm Hill – (2013–2017), professional basketball player for the Star Hotshots of the Philippine Basketball Association
 Eddie Johnson – played professionally for 17 seasons in the NBA, and the league's 35th all-time leading scorer
 Johnny "Red" Kerr – member of the 1952 Final Four team, played professionally for 11 seasons in the NBA, first head coach for both the Chicago Bulls and Phoenix Suns, and a former broadcaster for the Chicago Bulls.
 Meyers Leonard – (2010–2012), center for the Portland Trail Blazers, eleventh overall pick in 2012 NBA draft
 Demetri McCamey – Turkish Basketball League player
 Ken Norman – (1984–1987), played professionally for 10 seasons in the NBA
 Don Ohl – basketball (1954–1958), played 10 seasons (1960–1970) in the NBA for three teams (Detroit Pistons, Baltimore Bullets, St. Louis/Atlanta Hawks ), 5xNBA All-Star
 Johnny Orr – basketball (1944–45), Named the National Coach of the Year for the 1976 season and Big Ten Coach of the Year in college basketball while coaching at Michigan
 Stan Patrick – former National Basketball Association player
 Andy Phillip – basketball (1941–1943, 1946–1947), Member of the "Whiz Kids", played 11 seasons of professional basketball for the Chicago Stags, Philadelphia Warriors, Fort Wayne Pistons and Boston Celtics (1947–1958), Head Coach of the St. Louis Hawks (1958–1959), 5xNBA All-Star, 2x Consensus All-American
 Roger Powell – former National Basketball Association player
 Brian Randle (born 1985) – basketball player for Maccabi Tel Aviv of the Israeli Basketball Super League
 Dave Scholz – former National Basketball Association player
 Cindy Stein – basketball, head women's basketball coach at the University of Missouri since 1998
 Jaylon Tate – professional basketball player in the National Basketball League of Canada
 Deon Thomas – American-Israeli former Euroleague basketball player
 Deron Williams – National Basketball Association player
 Frank Williams – has been part of the NBA's New York Knicks, Denver Nuggets, Chicago Bulls, and Los Angeles Clippers
 Ray Woods – basketball (1913–1917), Names Helms Foundation College Basketball Player of the Year (1917), 3xHelms Foundation All-American (1915–1917), 3xFirst Team All-Big Ten

Football

 Paul Adams – Former Deerfield High School coach
 Alex Agase – Former National Football League player, Cleveland Browns, Member of the College Football Hall of Fame
 Ron Acks – former National Football League player, linebacker for the Atlanta Falcons
 Jeff Allen – football (2008–2011), offensive tackle for the Kansas City Chiefs
 Alan Ball – National Football League player, cornerback for the Jacksonville Jaguars
 Arrelious Benn – National Football League player, wide receiver for the Tampa Bay Buccaneers
 Chuck Boerio – National Football League player, linebacker for the Green Bay Packers
 Ed Brady – former National Football League player, linebacker for the Cincinnati Bengals
 Josh Brent – National Football League player, defensive tackles for the Dallas Cowboys
 Bill Brown – former National Football League player, running back for the Minnesota Vikings
 Darrick Brownlow – former National Football League player, linebacker for the Dallas Cowboys
 Lloyd Burdick – National Football League tackle
 Dick Butkus – National Football League linebacker; member of the Pro Football Hall of Fame
 Luke Butkus– National Football League coach, offensive line coach for the Chicago Bears, nephew of Dick Butkus
 J. C. Caroline – former National Football League player, defensive back and halfback for the Chicago Bears
 Danny Clark IV – National Football League player, linebacker for the New Orleans Saints
 Steve Collier – National Football League player, offensive tackle for the Green Bay Packers
 Jameel Cook – former National Football League player, fullback for the Tampa Bay Buccaneers
 Vontae Davis – National Football League player, cornerback for the Indianapolis Colts
 Mark Dennis – former National Football League player, offensive tackle for the Miami Dolphins
 David Diehl – National Football League player, offensive guard for the New York Giants
 Doug Dieken – former National Football League player, offensive tackle for the Cleveland Browns
 Ken Dilger – (1991–1994), played professionally for the Indianapolis Colts and Tampa Bay Buccaneers; starting Tight end in Super Bowl XXXVII
 Charles Carroll "Tony" Eason – (1979–1983) played professionally for the New England Patriots; led team to Super Bowl XX
 Moe Gardner – former National Football League player, former defensive line for the Atlanta Falcons
 Jeff George – first overall pick of 1990 NFL Draft by the Indianapolis Colts, also played for a variety of teams including the Atlanta Falcons, Oakland Raiders, and the Washington Redskins
 Lou Gordon – former National Football League player, defensive end for the Chicago Cardinals
 Red Grange – charter member of the Pro Football Hall of Fame
 Howard Griffith – former National Football League player, fullback for the Denver Broncos
 George Halas – former National Football League coach for the Chicago Bears; charter member of the Pro Football Hall of Fame
 Don Hansen – former National Football League player, linebacker for the Atlanta Falcons
 Kevin Hardy – played professionally for the NFL's Jacksonville Jaguars, Dallas Cowboys, and Cincinnati Bengals
 Kelvin Hayden – National Football League player, cornerback for the Chicago Bears
 Brad Hopkins – first round pick in the 1993 NFL Draft by the Tennessee Titans and future all-pro.
 Michael Hoomanawanui – (2007–2009), tight end for the New England Patriots
 A.J. Jenkins – (2008–2011)), wide receiver for the Kansas City Chiefs, thirtieth overall pick in 2012 NFL Draft
 Henry Jones – former National Football League player, safety for the Buffalo Bills
 Brandon Jordan – Canadian Football League player, defensive tackle for the BC Lions
 William G. Kline – head coach for the University of Florida and University of Nebraska football and basketball teams
 Mikel Leshoure – National Football League player, running back for the Detroit Lions
 Greg Lewis – National Football League player, wide receiver for the Philadelphia Eagles
 Brandon Lloyd – (1999–2002), wide receiver for the San Francisco 49ers, 2010 Pro Bowler and 2010 NFL receiving yards leader
 Corey Liuget – (2008–2010), defensive end for the San Diego Chargers, eighteenth overall pick in 2011 NFL Draft
 Rashard Mendenhall – National Football League player, running back for the Arizona Cardinals and Pittsburgh Steelers.
 Whitney Mercilus – (2009–2011), linebacker for the Houston Texans, twenty-sixth overall pick in the 2012 NFL Draft
 Brandon Moore – former National Football League player, former offensive guard for the New York Jets
 Aaron Moorehead – National Football League player, wide receiver for the Indianapolis Colts
 Ray Nitschke – played professionally for the NFL's Green Bay Packers, and an enshrined member of the Pro Football Hall of Fame
 Tony Pashos – National Football League player, offensive tackle for the Baltimore Ravens
 Preston Pearson – (1963–1967), Played 13 seasons in the NFL for the Colts, Steelers and Cowboys despite not playing college football
 Frosty Peters – former National Football League player
 Neil Rackers – National Football League player, kicker for the Houston Texans
 Simeon Rice – former National Football League player, defensive end
 Scott Studwell – football (1972–1976), Played 14 seasons (1977–1990) for the Minnesota Vikings, 2-time Pro-Bowler
 Marques Sullivan – Playboy All-American Tackle that played 4 season with NFL's Buffalo Bills, New York Giants, and New England Patriots
 Pierre Thomas – National Football League player, running back for the New Orleans Saints
 Bruce Thornton – former National Football League player, defensive tackle for the Dallas Cowboys
 Fred Wakefield – National Football League player, offensive guard for the Arizona Cardinals
 Steve Weatherford – National Football League player, punter for the New York Giants
 Eugene Wilson – National Football League player, defensive back for the New England Patriots
 Isiah John "Juice" Williams – football (2006–2009), NFL Free Agent

Golf
 Bob Goalby – professional golfer; won 1968 Masters Tournament
 D. A. Points – golf, PGA golfer (1999–present)
 Steve Stricker – (1986–1990), PGA golfer (1990–present)
 Thomas Pieters – (2010–2013), PGA golfer (2013-present)

Wrestling
 David Otunga – professional wrestler; two-time WWE Tag Team Champion
 Lindsey Durlacher – two-time All-American Greco-Roman wrestler
 Mark Jayne – wrestler; two-time NWCA All-Star Member
 Jeff Monson – wrestler; two-time gold medalist (99' and 05') ADCC Submission Wrestling World Championships, current mixed martial artist, formerly for the Ultimate Fighting Championship
 Jesse Delgado – wrestler, three-time All-American, two-time National Champion at 125 lbs.

Olympics
 Kevin Anderson – Olympian in men's tennis 2008 Summer Olympics in Beijing; 2015 U.S. Open quarterfinalist
 Michelle Bartsch-Hackley – gold medalist in women's volleyball 2020 (2021) Summer Olympics in Tokyo
 Avery Brundage, B.S. 1909 – Olympian, International Olympic Committee (IOC) President (1952–1972)
 Dike Eddleman – (1947–49), also tied for 2nd at the 1948 Summer Olympics in the high jump
 Abie Grossfeld – Olympic, Pan Am, and Maccabiah Games gymnast and coach
 George Kerr – (1958–1960), all-time Big Ten Olympian list, champion sprinter and 400/800 meter runner from Jamaica, 1960 Rome, Italy Summer Olympic bronze medal 800 meter winner
 Don Laz – track & field, record setting American pole vaulter and silver medalist in Pole Vault in the 1952 Olympic Games in Helsinki, Finland
 Daniel Kinsey – gold medalist in men's 110 m hurdles, 1924 Summer Olympics in Paris
 Jonathan Kuck – silver medalist in speed skating in the 2010 Winter Olympics in Vancouver
 Don Laz – silver medalist in pole vault in the 1952 Helsinki, Finland Games; architect in Champaign, Illinois; his design career was cut short by a stroke
 Tatyana McFadden – USA paralympian athlete competing mainly in category T54 sprint events, team member for the 2012 London Olympics
 Herb McKenley – silver medalist in 400 m, 1948 Summer Olympics in London; silver medal in 100 m and 400 m, gold medal in 4 × 400 m relay, 1952 Summer Olympics in Helsinki
 Harold Osborn – won two gold medals in the 1924 Summer Olympics, charter member of U.S. Track & Field Hall of Fame
 Jordyn Poulter – gold medalist in women's volleyball 2020 (2021) Summer Olympics in Tokyo
 Bob Richards – gold medalist in pole vault in the 1952 Helsinki and 1956 Melbourne Games
 Ashley Spencer – bronze medalist in 2016 Rio de Janeiro Olympics, 400 meter hurdles; 2013 world champion, 4-x-400 relay
 Justin Spring – (2002–2006), member of the bronze medal-winning men's gymnastics team at the 2008 Summer Olympics
 Craig Virgin – long-distance runner, 1975 NCAA cross country champion, 1980 and 1981 world cross-country champion
 Deron Williams – USA basketball team member for the 2012 London Olympics

Other
 Perdita Felicien – first female in Illinois history to win a gold medal in an individual event at the World Championships
 Belal Muhammad – (Law) professional mixed martial artist for the UFC
 Billy Arnold – Race driver and winner of the 1930 Indianapolis 500 mile race

Fictional
 Lt. Col. Henry Blake, portrayed by McLean Stevenson on M*A*S*H
 Cam Tucker, portrayed by Eric Stonestreet on Modern Family

Miscellaneous

 Fred Goetz AKA "Shotgun" George Ziegler, prohibition-era gunman and associate of mobsters Gus Winkler and Fred Burke.

Notable faculty

Presidents

Chancellors

Nobel laureates

 John Bardeen, 1951–1991– awarded Nobel Prizes for Physics in 1953 for co-inventing the transistor and again in 1972 for work on superconductivity (one of the four people in the world to win multiple Nobel Prizes and the only one who won twice in Physics)
 Elias James (E.J.) Corey, 1951–1959 – Nobel laureate (Chemistry, 1990)
 Leonid Hurwicz, 1950–1951, 2001 – Nobel laureate (Economics, 2007)
 Paul Lauterbur, 1985–2007 – Nobel laureate (Physiology or Medicine, 2003)
 Anthony James Leggett, 1983 – Nobel laureate (Physics, 2003)
 Salvador Luria, 1950–1959 – Nobel laureate (Physiology or Medicine, 1969)
 Rudolph Marcus, 1964–1968 – Nobel laureate (Chemistry, 1992)
 Franco Modigliani, 1948–1952 – Nobel laureate (Economics, 1985)
 Alvin E. Roth, 1974–1982 – Nobel laureate (Economics, 2012 )

Pulitzer Prize winners
 Leon Dash, faculty – Explanatory Journalism, 1995
 Bill Gaines, faculty – Investigative Reporting, 1976 and 1988
 Richard Powers, faculty – Fiction, 2019

Other
 Elmer H. Antonsen, Ph.D. 1961, faculty 1967–1996, chair of the Department of Germanic Languages and Literatures, later chair of the Department of Linguistics
 William Bagley, faculty 1908–1917 – an original proponent of educational essentialism
 Tamer Başar – Swanlund Endowed Chair & CAS Professor of Department of Electrical and Computer Engineering; winner of Richard E. Bellman Control Heritage Award in 2006
 Gordon Baym, Professor Emeritus in Physics, a theoretician in a wide range of fields including condensed matter physics, nuclear physics, and astrophysics.
 Nina Baym, Professor of English 1963–2004, literary critic and literary historian
 Richard Blahut – former chair of the Electrical and Computer Engineering Department at the University of Illinois Urbana-Champaign, best known for his Blahut–Arimoto algorithm used in rate–distortion theory; winner of IEEE Claude E. Shannon Award in 2005 and the recipient of IEEE Third Millennium Medal
 Leonard Bloomfield, faculty 1910–1921 – linguist who led the development of structural linguistics
 Eleanor Blum, Professor Emerita of Library Science at the University of Illinois Urbana-Champaign.
 Jean Bourgain, faculty – Fields Medal in Mathematics of International Mathematical Union, 1994
 Zong-qi Cai, leads the Forum on Chinese Poetic Cultire
 Ira Carmen, 1968–2009 – first political scientist elected to the Human Genome Organization; co-founder of the social science subdiscipline of genetics and politics
 Wallace Hume Carothers – organic chemist, inventor of nylon and first synthetic rubber (Neoprene)
 Weng Cho Chew – professor of electrical and computer engineering, member of National Academy of Engineering
 Ron Dewar – music educator, jazz saxophonist, leader of influential Memphis Nighthawks
 Anne Haas Dyson, Professor in Curriculum and Instruction
 Jan Erkert, chair of the Department of Dance; Fulbright scholar
 Joseph L. Doob, faculty 1935–1978 – developed a theory of mathematical martingales
 Donald B. Gillies, 1928–1975, professor of mathematics, pioneer in computer science and game theory
 Heini Halberstam, 1980–1996 – professor of mathematics, known for the Elliott–Halberstam conjecture Elliott–Halberstam conjecture
 David Gottlieb, 1946–1982 – discovered chloramphenicol; Guggenheim Fellow, Biology-Plant Science, 1963
 Donald J. Harris, 1966–1967 – asst. professor of economics, later prof. of economics at Stanford University; father of Vice President Kamala D. Harris
 William Walter Hay, 1956–1977 professor of railway engineering remembered with the American Railway Engineering and Maintenance-of-Way Association Hay Award
 Lejaren Hiller, faculty 1952–1968 – chemist and composer; invented process for dyeing Orlon; pioneer in music composition by computer (1950s)
 Nick Holonyak, Jr. – Lemelson-MIT Prize (2004), National Medal of Technology (2002), National Medal of Science (1990); credited for the invention of the LED and the first semiconductor laser to operate in the visible spectrum
 Sri Mulyani Indrawati, M.A., Ph.D. 1992 – managing director of the World Bank Group (since 2010), former Finance Minister of Indonesia (2005–2010)
 Ivan R. King, 1956-1954, professor of astronomy
 Donald William Kerst, 1938–1957 – developed the betatron
 Petar V. Kokotovic – winner of Richard E. Bellman Control Heritage Award in 2002
 Frederick Wilfrid Lancaster, Library and Information Science Professor from 1972 to 1992. He was later promoted to professor emeritus (a position he held until 2013) of Library and Information Science
 Jean-Pierre Leburton – Gregory E. Stillman Professor of Electrical and Computer Engineering and professor of Physics
 Stephen E. Levinson – professor of Electrical and Computer Engineering
 Stephen P. Long – environmental plant physiologist, Fellow of the Royal Society and member of the National Academy of Sciences studying how to improve photosynthesis to increase the yield of food and biofuel crops
 Francis Wheeler Loomis, Head of Physics Department 1929–1957 – former Guggenheim Fellow; established school's physics department
 Catherine J. Murphy – professor of chemistry
 Lisa Nakamura, Director of the Asian American Studies Program – Author of "Digitizing Race: Visual Cultures of the Internet" (2008), "Cybertypes: Race, Ethnicity and Identity on the Internet" (2002), and co-editor of "Race in Cyberspace" (2002)
 Marie Hochmuth Nichols, faculty 1939–1976 – influential rhetorical critic
 Mangalore Anantha Pai, power engineer, Shanti Swarup Bhatnagar laureate
 Don Patinkin (1922–1995) – Israeli-American economist, and President of the Hebrew University of Jerusalem
 Herbert Penzl, faculty 1938–1950 – Austrian-American linguist specialized in Germanic philology 
 Ernst Alfred Philippson, faculty 1947–1968 – German philologist, longtime editor of the Journal of English and Germanic Philology
 Catherine Prendergast – scholar of English and intellectual history, 2004 Guggenheim Fellowship recipient
 Abram L. Sachar, 1923–1948 – founding president of Brandeis University
 Theodore Sougiannis, distinguished professor of accountancy
 Timothy D. Stark, since 1991 - Professor of Geotechnical Engineering in the Department of Civil and Environmental Engineering
 Dora Dougherty Strother, 1949–1950 – aviation instructor, test pilot, Women Airforce Service Pilot, and one of the first women to pilot a B-29 bomber.
 Fred W. Tanner, 1923–1956 – food microbiologist; charter member of the Institute of Food Technologists; founder of scientific journal Food Research (now the Journal of Food Science)
 Alexandre Tombini, Governor of the Central Bank of Brazil
 Brian Wansink, 1997–2005 – Julian Simon professor and author of Mindless Eating: Why We Eat More Than We Think
 William Warfield, 1976–1990 – bass-baritone singer; chair of the Division of Voice in the College of Music
 Elmo Scott Watson, 1916–1924 – journalism professor who specialized in the American West
 Carl Woese – Crafoord Prize recipient (bioscience, 2003); professor of microbiology; foreign member of the Royal Society; defined the Archaea
 Ladislav Zgusta, faculty 1971–1995 – chair of the Department of Linguistics; director of the Center for Advanced Study; historical linguist and lexicographer from Czechoslovakia

See also

 List of people from Illinois
 Pinto Bean, a piebald squirrel who lived on the UIUC campus

References

Lists of people by university or college in Illinois